Ronald John Edward Ellis (born January 8, 1945) is a Canadian former professional ice hockey player. Ellis played 16 seasons in the National Hockey League for the Toronto Maple Leafs. Ellis won the Stanley Cup in 1967, and took part in the famed 1972 Summit Series against the Russian National team. After playing, Ellis went into business, and later joined the staff of the Hockey Hall of Fame.

Playing career
Ellis was signed by the Leafs and played junior hockey with the Toronto Marlboros of the Ontario Hockey Association from 1961–1964. He played on the team that won the Memorial Cup in 1964. Ellis became a full-time Leaf in 1964–65 and played 11 seasons to 1974–75, winning the Stanley Cup in 1967.

Ellis was also a member of Team Canada at the 1972 Summit Series, one of only seven Canadians to play every game in the series, and part of the only line to play together for every game, with centre Bobby Clarke and left winger Paul Henderson.

Ellis retired at age 30 during Leafs training camp in 1975, coming off the most productive season of his career with 61 points. He said he no longer had the desire to play and denied that his decision had anything to do with being passed over as team captain in favour of Darryl Sittler a month earlier.

In 1977, Ellis came out of retirement to play for Canada at the world hockey championships and then decided to resume his NHL career with the Leafs in 1977–78.

Punch Imlach was hired as general manager of the Leafs for the 1979–80 season and didn't feel that Ellis was worth the money he was being paid. He offered to buy out Ellis's contract at the end of the season, but the two couldn't reach an agreement. Despite objections from new coach Mike Nykoluk, Imlach put Ellis on waivers during the 1980–81 season and gave him an ultimatum: retire or be sent to the minor leagues. The 36-year-old Ellis chose to retire. He had played 1,034 career NHL games scoring 332 goals and 308 assists for 640 points.

After his life in hockey, worked as a teacher and in insurance. For six years, Ellis ran his own sporting goods store. In 1993, he joined the Hockey Hall of Fame as a director of public affairs and assistant to the president. , Ellis is still director of public affairs for the Hockey Hall of Fame in Toronto.

The stresses of life after hockey took its toll. In 1986 a bout with clinical depression began. He would later go public with his story by writing a book with Kevin Shea titled Over The Boards: The Ron Ellis Story, published in 2002. Today, he is a speaker on the importance of diagnosing and treating clinical depression.

On October 17, 2016, Ellis was part of a healthy class inducted into the Ontario Sports Hall of Fame at the Sheraton Centre Toronto Hotel, where he thanked Jim Gregory as his mentor and coach.

Awards and achievements
Ellis earned an unusual tribute in 1968 when former Leafs star Ace Bailey—then working as a timekeeper at Maple Leaf Gardens—declared that he admired Ellis so much, he wanted the team to give his retired #6 to Ellis. Bailey's number had been retired following his career-ending injury in 1933. Ellis, who had been wearing #8, changed to #6 for the rest of his career, after which the number was re-retired.

 1966–67 - Stanley Cup Champion
 1963–64 - NHL All-Star Game
 1964–65 - NHL All-Star Game
 1967–68 - NHL All-Star Game
 1969–70 - NHL All-Star Game
 1972 Summit Series Champion

Career statistics

Regular season and playoffs

International

International play
 1972 - Member of Team Canada in the Summit Series
 1977 - Member of Team Canada in the World Hockey Championships

See also
List of NHL players with 1000 games played
list of NHL players who spent their entire career with one franchise

References

External links

1945 births
Living people
Canadian ice hockey right wingers
Hockey Hall of Fame employees
Ice hockey people from Ontario
Stanley Cup champions
Toronto Maple Leafs players
Toronto Marlboros players
Sportspeople from Kawartha Lakes